Jimmy Smallhorne is an Irish filmmaker who wrote, directed and acted in his debut feature film 2by4. The drama about a closeted gay construction worker in New York City  was nominated for the Grand Jury Prize at the 1998 Sundance Film Festival and received the Festival's Cinematography award for the camera work of Declan Quinn (Leaving Las Vegas, Vanya on 42nd Street, Kama Sutra: A Tale of Love).
 
Smallhorne appeared in the crime thriller When the Sky Falls. At the 2004 Cannes Film Festival, it was announced that Smallhorne would direct his comedy screenplay Pushers Needed with an all-star cast of Joan Allen, Claire Danes, Kathy Bates, Brenda Blethyn and Maggie Smith.

Smallhorne grew up in the Ballyfermot suburb of Dublin, Ireland. He emigrated to the United States in 1994, finding work as a construction laborer. While working in construction, Smallhorne helped organize the Irish Bronx Theater.

In 2020 he appeared in the crime drama series Dead Still.

References

External links

Irish male film actors
Irish film directors
Irish emigrants to the United States
People from County Dublin
Year of birth missing (living people)
Living people